Alexandria Station is a pastoral lease that operates as a cattle station and is the Northern Territory's largest pastoral property and Australia's third largest pastoral property after Anna Creek station and Clifton Hills Station.

Location
Alexandria shares a boundary to the west with Alroy Downs and Brunette Downs Station, to the north with Mittiebah and Mount Drummond Station, to the south with West Ranken, East Ranken, Adder and Rocklands Stations and to the east with the Queensland border.
Several ephemeral waterway cross the property including the Buchanan river, Ranken River, Buchanan Creek, Cigarette Hole Creek and other smaller tributaries. The South Barkly Stock Route crosses the property at the south west corner.

Description

The station is currently one of 15 properties owned by the North Australian Pastoral Company who has owned it since 1877, making Alexandria NAPCos oldest and largest property. The plains are covered with Mitchell grass that supports a herd of about 55,000 cattle and allow the owners to harvest some 10,000 bales of hay per annum for use on other properties in the group. Alexandria shares a boundary with Mittiebah Station, another  NAPCo. property.

50 employees live on the station with the main homestead being situated close to the Playford River. Two outstations are found on the property; Soudan is along the Rankin River and Gallipoli which is on the eastern side of the lease.

Initially Alexandria used to run Shorthorn cattle but in 1982 the decision was made that Brahman would be more suitable for the harsh environment, particularly the heat and ticks. Since then Belmont and Charbray cattle have been added to the herd.

History
Waanyi (also known as Wanyi, Wanyee, Wanee, Waangyee, Wonyee, Garawa, and Wanji) is an Australian Aboriginal language of the Gulf Country. The language region includes the western parts of Lawn Hill Creek and Nicholson River, from about the boundary between the Northern Territory and Queensland, westwards towards Alexandria Station, Doomadgee, and Nicholson River. It includes the local government area of the Aboriginal Shire of Doomadgee.

A murder was committed at the station in 1885 when a station hand named Ross was killed, apparently by an axe-wielding assailant, while he was returning to his camp after spending the day sinking a well. Ross's colleagues, who said they weren't with him when he was killed but heard his cries, told the press (and presumably police) that the assailant had been one of a group of Aboriginal people who were camped relatively close by, and who must have stolen the murder weapon earlier. Ross's colleagues also said they'd gone looking for the unknown murderer(s) the next day, but couldn't find them. Another man named John Corbett died at the station in the same year when the dynamite he was using to deepen a well exploded prematurely causing him to fall to the bottom. He later died of shock and his other injuries.

Heavy flooding occurred in the area about the station during the monsoon of 1895. Alexandria received  of rain in January 1895.

In 1901 the area had the best rains since 1894 with  falling over 4 days that April. Drought followed the next year with the station's bores also running dry despite being sunk to a depth of 
 
The cattle king, Sidney Kidman, announced in 1907 that he would be purchasing all the male cattle produced on the station for the next three years. Kidman expected a total of between 9,000 and 10,000 head of cattle to be acquired.
 
Stock had to be quarantined in an area of  around Borrodo waterhole in 1918 following an outbreak of red-water amongst cattle that were travelling to Brunette Downs Station.

Periodic flooding is a way of life in Alexandria, with both the Playford and Rankin rivers breaking their banks. At the time Alexandria had no boat and a passenger who had arrived by plane had to be ferried across the Playford in a bathtub.

Peter Sherwin was a Jackaroo at Alexandria in 1946 when he was 16 years old, he remained here for six years before leaving to Helen Springs Station. Sherwin would later on purchase a string of properties including Victoria River Downs Station in 1986.

Alexandria and the rest of the Tablelands were struck by drought in 1952 which was eventually broken by heavy falls in May of that year.

In 1955, Alexandria and other stations in the surrounding area were victims of the largest cattle duffing ring since the war years.  The duffers were caught after several months of tracking down the stolen beasts in hidden gullies around the area. A special court was set up at Alexandria to hear the charges.

Much of the station was left underwater following heavy rains in 2009 and 2012 where flooding turned the area into an inland sea.

See also
List of ranches and stations
List of the largest stations in Australia

References

Stations (Australian agriculture)
Pastoral leases in the Northern Territory
1877 establishments in Australia